Thomas Nørret (born 17 February 1974) is a Danish professional golfer.

Career
Nørret turned professional in 1999 at the relatively late age of 25, having spent time studying in both Denmark and the United States. He immediately joined the second-tier Challenge Tour and found instant success, posting two runners-up finishes in his debut season and finishing 25th in the final standings, just outside the automatic qualifiers for the European Tour. Nørret became a Challenge Tour regular over the following seasons, claiming his first win in 2002 at the Volvo Finnish Open after a six-month break, but never improved on his 1999 performance, and in 2009 he took a break from tournament golf to manage young players, returning only for a few events in 2006 and 2009. In 2010 Nørret made a comeback, playing several Challenge Tour events before progressing through qualifying school to reach the European Tour for the first time at the age of 36.

At the 2011 Austrian Golf Open on the European Tour, Nørret took a two stroke lead into the final round after shooting 9-under-par over the first three days. He then shot a final round level par to finish solo fourth, his best result on the European Tour so far.

Professional wins (5)

Challenge Tour wins (1)

Challenge Tour playoff record (0–1)

Nordic Golf League wins (4)

Team appearances
Amateur
European Youths' Team Championship (representing Denmark): 1994

See also
2010 European Tour Qualifying School graduates
2011 European Tour Qualifying School graduates

References

External links

Danish male golfers
European Tour golfers
Sportspeople from the Region of Southern Denmark
People from Kolding
1974 births
Living people